is a former Japanese football player.

Playing career
Kato was born in Hiroshima Prefecture on May 28, 1981. After graduating from high school, he joined the J1 League club Avispa Fukuoka in 2000. However he did not play much and the club was relegated to the J2 League in 2002. On August 1, 2002, he debuted as substitute center back in the 83rd minute against Kawasaki Frontale. He played several matches after that. In 2004, he moved to the newly promoted Japan Football League (JFL) club, Thespa Kusatsu. He played often and the club was promoted to J2 at the end of the 2004 season. In 2005, he moved to the newly promoted JFL club, Mitsubishi Mizushima and played often. In 2006, he moved to the Regional Leagues club V-Varen Nagasaki. He played often and the club was promoted to JFL in 2009. He played as a regular player until 2010. In 2011, he moved to the Regional Leagues club Mitsubishi Heavy Industries Nagasaki. He retired at the end of the 2014 season.

Club statistics

References

External links

1981 births
Living people
Association football people from Hiroshima Prefecture
Japanese footballers
J1 League players
J2 League players
Japan Football League players
Avispa Fukuoka players
Thespakusatsu Gunma players
Mitsubishi Mizushima FC players
V-Varen Nagasaki players
Association football defenders